USS LST-947 was an  in the United States Navy. Like many of her class, she was not named and is properly referred to by her hull designation.

Construction
LST-947 was laid down on 15 August 1944, at Hingham, Massachusetts, by the Bethlehem-Hingham Shipyard; launched on 23 September 1944; and commissioned on 15 October 1944.

Service history
During World War II LST-947 was assigned to the Asiatic-Pacific theater and participated in the assault and occupation of Okinawa Gunto in April 1945.

Following the war, she performed occupation duty in the Far East until early July 1946. She was decommissioned on 16 August 1946, and struck from the Navy list on 15 October, that same year. The ship was sold to Bosey, Philippines, on 5 December 1947.

Awards
LST-947 earned one battle star for World War II service.

Notes

Citations

Bibliography 

Online resources

External links
 

 

1945 ships
LST-542-class tank landing ships
Ships built in Hingham, Massachusetts
World War II amphibious warfare vessels of the United States